Klong Chan Sports Center is a multi-purpose stadium in Bang Kapi, Bangkok, Thailand.  It is currently used mostly for football matches.  

Multi-purpose stadiums in Thailand